Ladpur Usmanpur is a village in Nawabganj tehsil in Bareilly district, Uttar Pradesh, India.

Reference 
Ladpur usmanpur is a village of uttarpradesh and district Bareilly and block Nawabganj and sarpanch of village  Mr Iqbal Ahmad in 2017.

Villages in Bareilly district